"That Old Black Magic" is a 1942 popular song written by Harold Arlen (music), with the lyrics by Johnny Mercer. They wrote it for the 1942 film Star Spangled Rhythm, when it was sung by Johnny Johnston and danced by Vera Zorina. The song was nominated for the Academy Award for Best Original Song in 1943 but lost out to "You'll Never Know".

It was first recorded by Gordon Jenkins and his Orchestra on July 9, 1942.  Shortly thereafter, on July 26, 1942, Judy Garland recorded her own version, which was released as a single in January 1943 – just after the movie's release on December 30, 1942. Five other recordings (also made in 1942) were released as singles within the next two weeks.

Composition
The song was published in 1942 and has become an often-recorded standard, with versions that include the original single release by Glenn Miller, by the singers Margaret Whiting, Frank Sinatra, Sammy Davis Jr., Mercer himself, and others. Mercer wrote the lyrics with Judy Garland in mind, who was, on occasion, an intimate partner. Garland recorded the song for Decca Records in 1942. Mercer recalled wanting to write a song about magic, and while composing, asking Arlen to write more music so the song could go on longer, but that they still wrote the whole song in about three hours. Billy Daniels recorded the song in 1949 and it became his trademark recording.

Recordings
The Glenn Miller recording was released by RCA Victor Records as catalog number 20-1523-A, with "A Pink Cocktail For a Blue Lady" as the B side. The vocals were by Skip Nelson and the Modernaires. Glenn Miller recorded the song on July 15, 1942. The release was Glenn Miller's last number-1 hit. It charted in 1943, spending 14 weeks on the Billboard magazine charts, peaking at position number 1 for the week of May 29.
The Margaret Whiting recording (with the Freddie Slack Orchestra, which got top billing on the label) was released by Capitol Records as catalog number 126. It charted in 1943, spending a week at number 10 on the Billboard chart.
The Sammy Davis Jr. recording was released by Decca Records as catalog number 29541. It charted in 1955 and spent six weeks on the Billboard charts, peaking at position number 16. 
The duet recorded by Louis Prima and Keely Smith was released as a single in 1958 on the Capitol label. It reached a peak of 18 on the Billboard Hot 100. This particular version was performed on Sam and Friends by Sam and Kermit the Frog, Sam performing as Prima and Kermit dressing in drag and performing as Smith. This sequence became one of the most well-known episodes of Sam and Friends.
Bobby Rydell had his version released as a single on Cameo in 1961. It reached number 21 on the Hot 100, and number 13 in Canada with co-chart "Don't Be Afraid".
Johnny Mathis recorded a disco rendition of this song for his 1979 studio album Mathis Magic.
Bob Dylan recorded a version of the song for his second album of standards, Fallen Angels.

Parodies
As part of his album My Name is Allan, Allan Sherman sang a parody of this song called "That Old Back Scratcher".

Popular culture
Marilyn Monroe famously sang the song in her film Bus Stop (1956). Her character Chérie is singing the song (somewhat out of key) to an audience who is not listening and talking loudly, until Don Murray quiets them all down.
In 1963, Jerry Lewis performed the song as suave hipster Buddy Love in his film The Nutty Professor.
The song appears several times in Star Trek: Voyager. In the episode "The Killing Game", Seven of Nine sings the song in character in a World War II-themed holodeck program, and in the Season Six episode "Virtuoso", The Doctor sings the song along with Harry Kim's band, the Kimtones.

References

1942 songs
1943 singles
Songs with music by Harold Arlen
Songs with lyrics by Johnny Mercer
1955 singles
1958 singles
1961 singles
Sammy Davis Jr. songs
Johnny Mathis songs
Glenn Miller songs
Marilyn Monroe songs
Bobby Rydell songs
Frank Sinatra songs
Margaret Whiting songs
Caterina Valente songs
Songs written for films
Male–female vocal duets
Pop standards
RCA Victor singles